Niamh Cusack (born 20 October 1959) is an Irish actress. Born to a family with deep roots in the performing arts, Cusack has been involved as a performer since a young age. She has served with the UK's two leading theatre companies, the  Royal Shakespeare Company and the Royal National Theatre and has performed in a long line of major stage productions since the mid-1980s. She has made numerous appearances on television including a long-running role as Dr. Kate Rowan in the UK series Heartbeat (1992–1995) which made her a household name and favourite. She has often worked as a voice actress on radio, and her film credits include a starring role in In Love with Alma Cogan (2011).

Early life
The daughter of the Irish actor Cyril Cusack, she is the sister of Sinéad Cusack and Sorcha Cusack, and half-sister of Catherine Cusack. She has two brothers, Paul Cusack, a television producer, and Pádraig Cusack, Producer for the Royal National Theatre of Great Britain. Cusack's husband is the actor Finbar Lynch; they have a son, Calam.

Education
Niamh Cusack was educated bi-lingually through Irish and English in Dublin.  Originally she trained as a professional flautist, winning a scholarship to study at the Royal Academy of Music, subsequently working as a freelance musician with the RTÉ National Symphony Orchestra and Concert Orchestra before winning a place at the Guildhall School of Music and Drama to train as an actress. Cusack left the school after one year without completing the course because she was offered her first professional acting job at the Gate Theatre in Dublin, playing the juvenile lead in their summer play.

Acting career
Cusack was then offered the role of Irina in Kasparov Wrede's production of Three Sisters at Royal Exchange, Manchester, before playing Desdemona in the Royal Shakespeare Company production of Othello opposite Ben Kingsley and Juliet in Romeo and Juliet opposite Sean Bean.

Cusack came to the wider public's attention when she starred as Dr. Kate Rowan in the popular 1990s television drama series Heartbeat (1992–1995), set in the 1960s in the North Riding of Yorkshire. Her character died from leukaemia in series 5 leaving her policeman husband Nick, played by Nick Berry, a widower. She had decided to leave the show after becoming pregnant. Cusack was nominated in the category of Best Actress in a TV Drama in 2004 at the Irish Television and Film awards IFTA for her role in the Cartlon Television TV film Too Good to be True. Niamh was nominated for a Whatsonstage.com Award in 2012 in the Best Supporting Actress in a Play category for her role in Playboy of the Western World at the Old Vic. In January 2013, she was nominated for a BBC Audio Drama Award in the Best Supporting Actress category for The Man with Wings by Rachel Joyce, produced by Gordon House, Goldhawk Essential Productions for Radio 4.

Cusack played Molly Bloom in James Joyce's Ulysses for BBC Radio 4 which aired a new 9-part adaptation dramatised by Robin Brooks, produced and directed by Jeremy Mortimer. The series began on Bloomsday (16 June) 2012.

In 1989 Cusack took the part of an actress, Valerie Saintclair, in the ninth episode of the first series of Agatha Christie's Poirot entitled The King of Clubs.

Other television acting credits also include Christine Fletcher in Always and Everyone (1999–2002), a British accident and emergency medical series alongside Martin Shaw; Grace Haslett in the miniseries State of Mind alongside Andrew Lincoln; Julie Flynn in the one off drama Rhinoceros alongside Robson Green and the small but important role of Beatrix Potter in the TV series The World of Peter Rabbit and Friends (1992–1995). She played Wodehouse's Bobbie Wickham in the ITV series Jeeves and Wooster (1990–1993). She played a character in an Agatha Christie's Marple series ("4:50 from Paddington", 2004), and has starred in episodes of Midsomer Murders (2008) and A Touch of Frost (2009) and the film The Closer You Get (2000), alongside Sean McGinle, for which she was nominated for an IFTA Award for Best Supporting Actor in a Film.

Cusack starred opposite Sean Bean in the 1986 RSC production of Romeo and Juliet. Throughout the 1990s Cusack worked regularly on the London stage in a series of leading roles including Nora Clitheroe in Sam Mendes's acclaimed production of The Plough and the Stars (Young Vic) opposite Judi Dench, Rosalind in As You Like It (Barbican), Flora in Tom Stoppard's Indian Ink (Aldwych) and The Maids (Donmar Warehouse). In the summer of 2003, she appeared as Portia in Shakespeare's The Merchant of Venice at the Chichester Festival Theatre, directed by Gale Edwards. In 2004, Cusack joined the National Theatre for a stage adaptation (by Nicholas Wright) of Philip Pullman's His Dark Materials as Serafina Pekkala. The production also featured Anna Maxwell Martin, Ben Wishaw and Patricia Hodge. In 2007, Cusack returned to National Theatre to appear in Victoria Benedictsson's The Enchantment, and played Alison Ellis in Crestfall by Mark O'Rowe at Theatre503. In 2009, she played Maggie in the first major revival in London of Brian Friel's multi award-winning Dancing at Lughnasa alongside her husband Finbar Lynch at the Old Vic. In 2010, she played Catherine Dickens in Andersen's English, a play by Sebastian Barry. In 2011, she appeared in The Painter by Rebecca Lenkiewicz, opposite Toby Jones and followed it with the role of Edith Davenport in Cause Célèbre by Terence Rattigan and The Widow Quin in The Playboy of the Western World by J.M. Synge, both at the Old Vic.

In August 2012, Niamh Cusack rejoined the National Theatre to create the role of Siobhan in the world première of the stage adaptation of Mark Haddon's book The Curious Incident of a Dog in the Night-Time adapted by Simon Stephens and directed by Marianne Elliott. The show premièred on 2 August 2012. It also starred Luke Treadaway as Christopher, Nicola Walker as his mother Judy, Paul Ritter as his father Ed and Una Stubbs as Mrs. Alexander.

The production, which ran until late October 2012, was broadcast live to cinemas worldwide on 6 September 2012 through the National Theatre Live programme. The nominations for the 2013 Olivier Awards, which recognise excellence in professional productions staged in London, were announced on 26 March 2013; The Curious Case of the Dog in the Night-Time secured the most nominations with eight, including Best New Play, Best Director (Elliott), Best Actor (Treadaway), Best Actress in a Supporting Role, and other categories including Best Set Design, Best Lighting Design, Best Sound Design and Best Choreographer. The show transferred to the Apollo Theatre in Shaftesbury Avenue, London on 1 March 2013 with Cusack reprising her role of Siobhan.  Following a period in film and television including the  films Testament of Youth, Departure, Chick Lit and The Ghoul and the television series Rebellion, Cusack returned to the London stage in 2016 as Paulina in The Winter's Tale at the Globe and Owen McCafferty's Unfaithful at Found 111 in the West End.

In 2017, she was cast in the leading role of Lenú in the world première of the stage adaptation of the multi award-winning tetralogy of books My Brilliant Friend by Elena Ferrante at the Rose Theatre which transferred to the Olivier Theatre of the Royal National Theatre in 2019.  In between the transfer in 2018, Cusack returned to the Royal Shakespeare Company in another leading role as Lady Macbeth opposite Christopher Eccleston which transferred to London's Barbican Theatre. In the first stage adaptation of Kazuo Ishiguro's novel Remains of the Day by Barney Norris, Cusack was cast as Miss Kenton, the role previously made famous on screen by Emma Thompson.  During this busy period of theatre work, Cusack returned to the small screen as Janine in the acclaimed 4-part series The Virtues directed by Shane Meadows.

In April 2020, Cusack was scheduled to make her long-awaited début at the Abbey Theatre in Brian Friel's Faith Healer opposite Aidan Gillen and directed by Joe Dowling. Due to COVID-19, the production has been temporarily postponed.

she will star as Gertrude in Hamlet by Bristol Old Vic along with her real life husband Finbar Lynch

Personal life
Cusack is married to the actor Finbar Lynch.  They met when rehearsing in Dublin in the theatre production of Three Sisters in 1990.  They have one son, actor Calam Lynch.  Cusack is a keen athlete and has run the London Marathon for the charity St Joseph's Hospice in East London.

Filmography

Selected theatre credits
1985: Othello as Desdemona (Royal Shakespeare Company/Barbican, London)
1985: Mary, After the Queen (Royal Shakespeare Company)
1985: Anything Goes (Royal Shakespeare Company)
1985: Three Sisters as Irina (Royal Exchange, Manchester)
1986: Romeo and Juliet as Juliet (Royal Shakespeare Company/Barbican, London)
1987: The Art of Success (Royal Shakespeare Company/Barbican, London)
1987: Portrait of a Marriage (Royal Shakespeare Company/Barbican Theatre, London)
1988: The Tutor (Old Vic, London) – Alongside half sister Catherine Cusack
1988: The Admirable Crichton (West End - Theatre Royal Haymarket, London)
1990: Three Sisters as Irina (Gate Theatre, Dublin & Royal Court Theatre, London – Alongside sisters Sinead Cusack (Masha) & Sorcha Cusack (Olga) & her father Cyril Cusack)
1991: The Plough and the Stars as Nora Clitheroe (Young Vic Theatre, London)
1991: The Phoenix (Bush Theatre, London)
1993: A Doll's House as Nora (Gate Theatre, Dublin)
1995: Indian Ink as Flora (West End - Aldwych Theatre)
1996: As You Like It as Rosalind (Royal Shakespeare Company/Barbican, London)
1997: The Maids (Donmar Warehouse, London)
1998: Nabokov's Gloves (Hampstead Theatre, London)
2003: The Merchant of Venice as Portia (Chichester Festival Theatre)
2003: His Dark Materials as Serafina Pekkala (Royal National Theatre, London)
2005: Breathing Corpses (Royal Court Theatre/Jerwood Theatre Upstairs, London)
2006: Mammals (The Bush, London)
2007: The Way of the World (Royal Theatre, Northampton)
2007: The Enchantment (Royal National Theatre, London)
2007: Ghosts as Mrs Alving (Gate Theatre – Notting Hill, London)
2007: Crestfall (Theatre503, London)
2008: The Portrait of a Lady (Theatre Royal Bath)
2009: Dancing at Lughnasa as Maggie (West End - Old Vic Theatre)
2010: Anderson's English (Hampstead Theatre/Out of Joint and on tour)
2010: Women, Power and Politics (Tricycle Theatre, London)
2011: Cause Célèbre (West End - Old Vic Theatre)
2011: The Painter (Arcola Theatre, London)
2011: The Playboy of the Western World as Pegeen Mike (West End - Old Vic Theatre)
2012: The Curious Incident of the Dog in the Night-Time as Siobhan (Royal National Theatre, London)
2013: The Curious Incident of the Dog in the Night-Time as Siobhan (West End – Apollo Theatre)
2016: The Winter's Tale as Paulina (Shakespeare's Globe, London)
2016: Unfaithful (Theatre 111, London)
2017: My Brilliant Friend as Lenú (Rose Theatre, London)
2018: Macbeth as Lady Macbeth (Royal Shakespeare Company/Barbican, London)
2019: Remains of the Day as Kenton (Out of Joint/UK Tour)
2019: My Brilliant Friend as Lenú (Royal National Theatre, London)
2020: Faith Healer as Grace (Abbey Theatre, Dublin)

Awards and nominations
Nominated: BBC Audio Drama Awards 2013 – Best Supporting Actress for The Man with Wings by Rachel Joyce, for BBC Radio 4
Nominated: Whatsonstage.com Awards 2012 – Best Supporting Actress in a Play for Playboy of the Western World at Old Vic
Nominated: Irish Film and Television Awards IFTA 2004 – Best Actress in a TV Drama for Too Good to be True, Carlton TV
Winner: Received an Irish Life Award
Winner: Received an Irish Post Award

References

External links
 
Niamh Cusack IFTA nominee 2004
Niamh Cusack at BroadwayWorld.com
Niamh Cusack in The Curious Incident of the Dog in the Night-Time
Niamh Cusack – National Theatre Company Cast Bio (archive)
Niamh Cusack nomination for BBC Audio Award

1959 births
Living people
Niamh
Royal Shakespeare Company members
Irish film actresses
Irish television actresses
Actresses from Dublin (city)
Irish Shakespearean actresses
Irish stage actresses
People from Dalkey
Irish voice actresses
Irish radio actresses
20th-century Irish actresses
21st-century Irish actresses